Living Dead is a zombie-apocalypse film franchise created by George A. Romero and John A. Russo, and related media.

Living dead or Living Dead may also refer to:

 Undead, beings that are dead but behave as if alive in mythology, legend, and fiction

Books
 The Living Dead (novel), a 2021 novel by George A. Romero and Daniel Kraus

Film and television
 The Living Dead (film), a 1919 German silent film
 The Living Dead (TV series), a 1995 British documentary series
 "The Living Dead" (The Avengers), a television episode

Music
 The Living Dead (album) or the title song, by Bump of Chicken, 2000
 The Living Dead, an album by Grave Digger, 2018
 Living.../...Dead, a split EP by Mortician and Fleshgrind, 2004
 "Living Dead", a song by King Diamond from Deadly Lullabyes, 2004
 "Living Dead", a song by Marina and the Diamonds from Electra Heart, 2012